The Blind Christ is a 2016 Chilean drama film directed by Christopher Murray. It was selected to compete for the Golden Lion at the 73rd Venice International Film Festival.

Plot
Michael is a 30-year-old mechanic who believes he has experienced a divine revelation in the desert and has been bestowed with special powers. However, his village considers him crazy and dismisses his claims. One day, when he learns that a childhood friend has been injured in an accident, Michael sets out on a barefoot pilgrimage through the desert to find and heal him with a miracle.

During his journey, Michael meets vagabonds, hitmen, drug addicts, abandoned women, and people exploited by mining companies. They perceive him as a Christ-like figure who can alleviate their harsh realities. Despite the challenges and obstacles he faces, Michael perseveres, using his faith and abilities to help those he encounters.

Cast
 Michael Silva as Michael

References

External links
 

2016 films
2016 drama films
Chilean drama films
2010s Spanish-language films